Pomfrets are perciform fishes belonging to the family Bramidae. The family currently includes 20 species across seven genera. Several species are important food sources for humans, especially Brama brama in South Asia.  The earlier form of the pomfret's name was "", a word which probably ultimately comes from Portuguese pampo, referring to various fish such as the blue butterfish (Stromateus fiatola). The fish meat is white in color.

Distribution
They are found globally in the Atlantic, Indian, and Pacific Oceans, as well as numerous seas including the Norwegian, Mediterranean, and Sea of Japan.  Nearly all species can be found in the high seas. However, fishes in the genera Pterycombus and Pteraclis tend to be found off continental shelves. Further, fishes in the genus Eumegistus are hypothesized to be largely benthic and found to occupy deep water shelves.

Some species of pomfrets are also known as monchong, specifically in Hawaiian cuisine.

Genera
The following genera are placed within the family Bramidae:

 Brama Bloch & Schneider, 1801
 Eumegistus Jordan & Jordan, 1922
 Pteraclis Gronow, 1772
 Pterycombus Fries, 1837
 Taractes Lowe, 1843
 Taractichthys Mead & Maul, 1958
 Xenobrama Yatsu & Nakamura, 1989

See also
 Several species of butterfishes in the genus Pampus are also known as "pomfrets".
 List of fish families

References 

 

af:Pomfret (vis)